Féron is a commune in the Nord department in northern France.

Its population in 2019 was 564. The current mayor, elected in 2020, is Jean-François Baudry. There is an annual festival "Féron'Arts".

Heraldry

See also
Communes of the Nord department

References

External links

 Féron'Arts site

Communes of Nord (French department)